The following is an alphabetical list of members of the United States House of Representatives from the state of New Hampshire.  For chronological tables of members of both houses of the United States Congress from the state (through the present day), see United States congressional delegations from New Hampshire. The list of names should be complete, but other data may be incomplete.

Current representatives 

As of January 2019
 : Chris Pappas (D) (since 2019)
 : Ann McLane Kuster (D) (since 2013)

List of members

See also

List of United States senators from New Hampshire
United States congressional delegations from New Hampshire
New Hampshire's congressional districts

References
 
 
 Congressional Biographical Directory of the United States 1774–present

 
New Hampshire
United States representatives